Ølsted Parish is a parish in the Diocese of Helsingør in Halsnæs Municipality, Denmark. The parish contains the town of Ølsted.

References 

Halsnæs Municipality
Parishes of Denmark